Bourbon (foaled in 1774) was a British Thoroughbred racehorse that won the 1777 running of a race that would later be called the St. Leger Stakes.

Background
Bourbon was foaled in 1774 at the farm of his breeder Mr. Sotheron at Darrington near Pontefract, Yorkshire. The Sotherons were an old family based at Darrington Hall in Darrington, West Yorkshire. Bourbon was sired by Le Sang, a successful racehorse that stood near Catterick, Yorkshire at the same stud as Matchem until his death in 1778. Le Sang was not a widely utilized stallion but he did produce several good runners such as Orpheus and Duchefs. Bourbon's dam, Queen Elizabeth, was also bred by Sotheron and had won four races run over long distances with multiple heats during her racing career. Bourbon was her first of a total of three live foals produced for Mr. Sotheron. Bourbon's maternal family (Family 37) is relatively obscure, but did also produce the multiple stakes winner Dr. Syntax.

Racing career
Bourbon was not officially named until September 1778 and for the first part of his racing career, including the St. Leger win, was known as Mr. Sotheron's b.c. by Le Sang. Bourbon does not appear as a sire in the General Stud Book compiled by the Weatherby family in the early nineteenth century.

1777: three-year-old season
In the first start of his career at Hunmanby, Yorkshire on 13 May 1777, Mr. Sotheron's bay colt by Le Sang was second to a filly sired by Turk for a subscription race. On 23 September 1777 at Doncaster, Bourbon won a two-mile subscription race that would later be called the St. Leger Stakes. Running in a field of 10 horses, most of which were not formally named, and ridden by "Jockey John" Cade, Bourbon beat Mr. Hunloke's Le Sang filly and Sir Harpur's Snap filly.

1778: four-year-old season
Still referred to as Mr. Sotheron's "colt by Le Sang", he was second to the colt Little Askham for a subscription race run on 26 May at Hunmanby. Officially named Bourbon by September of that year, Bourbon finished third in a £50 race run over a series of four two-mile heats over the Doncaster course against five other horses. He was last in the first heat, first in the second and third for the remaining heats, the race won by Sir Dundas' colt Antonio by Squirrel. At Boroughbridge on 7 October, Bourbon won a £50 race run over a series of three two-mile heats, finishing last in the first heat but recovering to win the deciding heats. A few weeks later at New Malton, Yorkshire, Bourbon was third to Orpheus (also sired by Le Sang) and Macheath in another race over three two-mile heats, finishing fifth in the first heat and third in the remaining heats.

1779: five-year-old season
At Hunmanby on 18 May, Bourbon was fourth and last in a four-mile £50 race that was won by Mr. Bethell's Magnum Bonum. At York in August, Bourbon forfeited a match race against Lord Rockingham's horse Sextus Pompeius. In his last race of the season at Boroughbridge, he finished second to Mr. Radcliffe's Young Lofty in a series of two four-mile heats, finishing last in the first and second in the final heat.

Pedigree

Bourbon was inbred 3x4x4 to the Godolphin Arabian, meaning this horse appears once in the third generation and twice in the fourth generation of his pedigree.

References

1774 racehorse births
Racehorses bred in the Kingdom of Great Britain
Racehorses trained in the Kingdom of Great Britain
Thoroughbred family 37
Godolphin Arabian sire line
St Leger winners